Maurizio Perissinot (1 February 1951 – 12 December 2004) was an Italian rally co-driver, mainly for Attilio Bettega.

He survived the accident at the 1985 Tour de Corse which claimed the life of Bettega. He died on December 12, 2004 after a long illness.

References

1951 births
2004 deaths
Italian rally co-drivers